Olisa Agbakoba  is a Nigerian human rights activist, maritime lawyer and former President of Nigerian Bar Association.

Early life 
Olisa Agbakoba was born on 29 May 1953 to Chief Justice Godfrey Ubaka and Mrs Phina Agbakoba in Jos. He later moved to Onitsha in 1965, two years before the Nigerian civil war. He attended Government Primary School, Jos from 1959 to 1960, Hillcrest School, Jos; 1961, Government Primary School Jos, 1962 1963; Zixton Public School Ozubulu in 1964 and Christ the King College, Onitsha between 1966 and 1967.

Olisa Agbakoba also attended College of Immaculate Conception in Enugu from 1970 to 1972, Government College in Ughelli in 1973, University of Nigeria, Nsukka from 1973 to 1977, Nigerian Law School in Lagos in 1978 and London School of Economics & Political Science from 1979 to 1980.

He holds an LLB (Hons) of the University of Nigeria, BL of the Nigerian Law School and LLM (1980) of the University of London.

Early professional career 
Fresh out of law school, he served as a research fellow in the Nigerian Institute of International Affairs' (NIIA) Law and Intelligence Department. Agbakoba left NIIA after a year and formed his own law firm, Olisa Agbakoba and Associates, which specializes in commercial and maritime law. He has also been a key leader in the country's pro-democratic movement, and is the President of AfroNet, an international NGO dedicated to furthering the human rights cause. He is also a Principal Partner and founder of Human Rights Law Services (HURILAWS) an NGO that specializes in advocacy and law.

Aside from human rights, his work in maritime law in Nigeria has been profound. He is the founder and first president of the Nigerian Shipping Chamber of Commerce (NCS).

Achievements 
Olisa Agbakoba, is the former president of the Nigerian Bar Association from 2006 to 2008 and a founding partner of Olisa Agbakoba and Associates, a leading maritime specialist law firm in Lagos. He is also the founder of Nigeria's foremost human rights organization, the Civil Liberties Organisation (CLO). He became known through his work in human rights and democracy movement in Nigeria. He was also the founder of United Action for Democracy and the Zambian pan-African human rights organization AfroNet. He was a defender for the Civil Rights activist, Ken Saro-Wiwa who was executed and was arrested several times because of his pro – democratic activities.

Honours 
In 1990, he was honoured with Roger Baldwin Medal for Civil Liberties. Also in 1993, he was honoured with the Human Rights Award of the German Association of Judges and in 1996 he was given the Aachen Peace Award.

Other awards and honours include the receipt of the 15 Great Legal Practitioners of Distinction in Nigeria (1993), Vanguards 40 Outstanding Young Nigerians Award (1993), Fellow and award recipient, Institute of Administrative Management of Nigeria, co-director, British Council Conference on Managing Human Rights, Abuja, Nigeria, the International Human Rights Award of the American Bar Association, in recognition of extraordinary contributions to the causes of Human Rights, the Rule of Law and Promotion of Access to Justice (1996), Dr. Kwame Nkrumah African Leadership awards in 2006 and FRA Williams Legal Practitioner of the year 2006 amongst others.

Publications 
Amongst his major publications are Federal High Court Practice Manual (published by LexisNexis, South Africa) Maritime Newsletter Volumes one and two; Manual on Election Petition in Nigeria; Maritime Cabotage in Nigeria; Bankruptcy Proceedings in Nigeria; Development Law Books (in three volumes; Towards A People Constitution in Nigeria; Transcending the Wall: A manual for Prisoners Reform. Others are: The Legal basis of the organization of African Unity Force in the Chad; Journal of International Law, Nigerian Institute of International Affairs 1981; Journal of Human Rights Law and Practice: Nigeria's State Security (detention of persons) Decree No 2 of 1984; Exposing the Myth of Judicial Impotence with Babatunde Fagbohunlu (1991), Incursions into the Legal Profession, the way out speech given at the conference on the reform of civil adjudication, Lagos, December 1995; The Statute of Limitation in Admiralty Proceedings: A Case for Fresh Initiatives in Maritime Laws and Reforms in Marine Insurance Law, among many others.

Personal life 
Olisa Agbakoba is married to Lilian Agbakoba, who is also a lawyer by profession, has three daughters and six grandchildren and lives in Lagos.

References 

20th-century Nigerian lawyers
People from Jos
Civil rights activists
1953 births
Living people
Christ the King College, Onitsha alumni
Senior Advocates of Nigeria
Alumni of the University of London
Nigerian Law School alumni
University of Nigeria alumni
21st-century Nigerian lawyers
Nigerian human rights activists